Dağevi is a village in the Ardahan District, Ardahan Province, Turkey. Its population is 182 (2021).

History 
The old name of the village is Tebat in the records of 1889 and the word "tbeti" in Georgian means a kind of "lake". The name of the village in 1928 is Dibat.

Geography 
The village is 25 km from Ardahan city center. The nearest villages are Ardıçdere and Çatalköprü.

Population

References

Villages in Ardahan District